Katherine Ebanks-Wilks is a Caymanian politician who is serving as Speaker of Parliament of the Cayman Islands and Parliamentary Secretary to Ministry of Financial Services & Commerce and Ministry of Education.

References 

Year of birth missing (living people)
Living people